The 2015 Brazil bus accident occurred on 15 March 2015, when a tourist bus veered off a road and plunged approximately  into a ravine near the city of Joinville in Santa Catarina state in Brazil. At least 51 people died and 7 were injured in the accident.

References

Brazil
Bus accident
Road incidents in Brazil
Santa Catarina (state)